Lasowice Małe  (German: Klein Lassowitz, 1936-1945 Schloßwalden) is a village in the administrative district of Gmina Lasowice Wielkie, within Kluczbork County, Opole Voivodeship, in south-western Poland.

The village has a population of 553.

References

Villages in Kluczbork County